The 1980 New Zealand tour rugby to Australia and Fiji was the 24th tour by the New Zealand national rugby union team to Australia and ended with three matches at Fiji.

The last tour of "All Blacks" in Australia was the short 1979 tour.

All Blacks won only one test match on three and lost the Bledisloe Cup.

The tour 
Scores and results list New Zealand's points tally first.

Notes

External links 
 New Zealand in Australia and Fiji 1980 from rugbymuseum.co.nz

New Zealand
New Zealand tour
Australia tour
New Zealand national rugby union team tours of Australia
New Zealand national rugby union team tours
1980 in Fijian rugby union
Rugby union tours of Fiji